Sofiya Vlasova (born October 10, 1991 in Kyiv) is a Ukrainian short-track speed-skater.

Vlasova competed at the 2014 Winter Olympics for Ukraine. In the 1000 metres she was fourth in her heat, finishing 26th overall.

As of September 2014, Vlasova's best performance at the World Championships came in 2012, when she finished 21st in the 1000m.

As of September 2014, Vlasova's top World Cup ranking is 42nd, in the 1000 metres in 2013–14.

References 

1991 births
Living people
Ukrainian female short track speed skaters
Olympic short track speed skaters of Ukraine
Short track speed skaters at the 2014 Winter Olympics
Sportspeople from Kyiv